Vania King and Nadia Petrova were the defending champions, both of them were present this year, but played with different partners. King partnered with Zheng Jie and Petrova partnered with Gisela Dulko both lost to Daniela Hantuchová and Ai Sugiyama, in the first round and the semifinals respectively.Alisa Kleybanova and Francesca Schiavone won in the final 6–4, 6–2 against Daniela Hantuchová and Ai Sugiyama.

Seeds

Draw

Draw

External links
 Main Draw (English)
 Main Draw (Japanese)

Doubles